Scavenius is a surname. Notable people with the surname include:

Bente Scavenius (born 1944), Danish art historian, art critic and author
Alette Scavenius (born 1952), Danish theatre historian, artistic leader (Danish Theatre 300 years)
Erik Scavenius (1877–1962), Danish politician, foreign minister and prime minister 
Scavenius Cabinet, government of Denmark from 9 November 1942 to 5 May 1945
Harald Scavenius (1873–1939), Danish politician and foreign minister
Jacob Brønnum Scavenius ( 1749–1820), Danish landowner
Jacob Brønnum Scavenius Estrup (1825–1913), Danish politician
Ole Scavenius Jensen (1921–1990), Danish rower
Otto Scavenius (1875–1945), Danish politician
Theresa Scavenius (born 1984), Danish climate politics researcher and politician

See also
Scavenius' Stiftelse, is a listed building in Sorø, Denmark